Chinese walnut cookies, or hup toh soh, are popular and symbolically important cookies that are traditionally served to visitors during Chinese New Year celebrations.

Symbolism 
Walnuts are believed to be good for lung function and relieving lung and circulation symptoms. At the new year, eating walnuts is symbolic of ensuring happiness in the coming year.

Hup toh soh are traditionally served to visitors during Chinese New Year celebrations.

History 
According to legend, at the beginning of the Tang Dynasty, peasants from the surrounding counties of Jingdezhen such as Leping, Guixi and Yingtan went to be potters, and due to the busy work schedule at that time, a peasant from Leping would bring his own flour and mix it and put it directly on the surface of the kiln for baking, and since he had a cough all the time, he used to eat walnut to stop his cough, so he would add crushed walnut when baking. Other porcelain workers see this method to do the dry food for daily preservation and long-distance transport of porcelain when eating, they have followed suit, and named " walnut cookie", which is the origin of walnut cookie.

With the transport of porcelain, walnut cookie in transit one by one left a footprint, loved by the local people, and on its original basis with some local specialties, to the Tang Dynasty, Tianbao years, walnut cookie production process mature, better taste, was transmitted to the palace, became a common snack at the palace, after being called the "Palace walnut cookie".

In the Ming Dynasty, there were two chief ministers in Jiangxi, Xia Yan and Yan Song, one is loyal and the other is traitorous, Yan Song was promoted by Xia Yan, but Xia Yan was framed by Yan Song and died. Some of Xia Yan's descendants fled to Shangqing Guazhou Village, and some of them lived in Longtou mountain passed the way of making walnut cookie down from generation to generation.

Characteristics 
Walnut cookie is a special snack for both the north and the south, famous for its dry, crispy, crunchy and sweet characteristics.

Nutrition 
It contains carbohydrates, protein, fat, vitamins, and minerals such as calcium, potassium, phosphorus, sodium, magnesium, and selenium.

Chinese walnut cookie is a high-sugar and high-fat food, long-term consumption will induce obesity, cardiovascular disease and other threats to human health.

References 

Chinese cuisine
Chinese New Year foods
Cookies
Walnut dishes